Pichi Richi or Pitchi Richi may refer to the following items in Australia:

South Australia

Pichi Richi Pass, a pass in the southern Flinders Ranges
Pichi Richi Railway, a heritage railway
Hundred of Pichi Richi, a cadastral unit

Northern Territory

 Pitchi Richi Sanctuary, a former  tourist attraction near Alice Springs